Notre Dame Priory is a Roman Catholic Benedictine monastery in Colebrook, Tasmania, Australia, founded in 2017. The life of the community is in accordance with the Rule of Saint Benedict, and is centred around the traditional practice of prayer and work, as well as devotion to the traditional Latin Mass and Breviarium Monasticum.

History
The community was instituted as a private association of the faithful on 22 February 2017 by Fr Pius Mary Noonan O.S.B., formerly of the Abbey of Saint-Joseph de Clairval in Flavigny-sur-Ozerain, France, in the presence of Archbishop Julian Porteous of Hobart, and was installed in a property in Lindisfarne. Later the same year, the first group of four novices received the habit, and in December the community received canonical recognition as a public association of the faithful. In 2018, the community purchased the Jerusalem Estate in Colebrook, and relocated there the following year.

See also
List of monasteries in Australia
List of communities using the Tridentine Mass

References

External links
Official website

Roman Catholic monasteries in Australia
Benedictine monasteries in Australia
2017 establishments in Australia
Communities using the Tridentine Mass